Protarchanara is a genus of moths of the family Noctuidae.

Species
Protarchanara abrupta Eversmann, 1854
Protarchanara brevilinea Fenn, 1864

References
Natural History Museum Lepidoptera genus database
Protarchanara at funet

Noctuinae